The Fordham Graduate School of Social Service (GSS) is one of the six graduate schools of Fordham University. U.S. News & World Report has routinely ranked it among the top schools for social work in the United States.

History 
The Graduate School of Social Work was founded in 1916 and is typically consided among one of the oldest and largest social work schools in the United States. 

Originally located in the Leon Lowenstein Center at Fordham's Lincoln Center campus, the School has since expanded to offer instruction across three of Fordham's campuses in the New York City area. The school expanded in 1975, 1997, and 2008.  

GSS expanded their program in 2014 to include a hybrid model of study allowing students the option to take courses online and at Molloy College. Today, the School offers in-person, hybrid, and fully online programs.

Offerings & Programs

Degree Offerings 
GSS offers the following degree programs: 

 Bachelor of Arts in Social Work
 Master of Social Work
 Doctor of Philosophy in Social Work

The schools offers a M.S.W./M.P.H. joint degree in partnership with the Icahn School of Medicine at Mount Sinai and a M.S.W./J.D. joint degree through their law school. GSS also offers a number of non-degree programs including fellowship and executive education programs.

Centers & Institutes 
GSS hosts a number of centers, initiatives, and institutes as part of their mission statement to promote human rights and social justice. These programs often focus on specialized issues and research interests, they include:

 The Beck Institute on Religion and Poverty
 Children and Families Institute
 Fordham Center for Nonprofit Leaders
 Institute for Women and Girls
 Henry C. Ravazzin Center on Aging and Intergenerational Studies

Notable Faculty & Endowed Chairs 

 Anne Williams-Isom (J.D., Columbia University), James R. Dumpson Chair in Child Welfare Studies
 Shirley Gatenio Gabel (Ph.D., Columbia University), Quaranta Chair for Social Justice for Children
 Janna C. Heyman (Ph.D., Fordham University), Henry C. Ravazzin Chair in Gerontology

Accreditation 
The School is fully accredited by the Council on Social Work Education and is authorized to award baccalaureate and master's degrees in Social Work.

References

External Links 

 

Graduate School of Social Service
Schools of social work in the United States
Educational institutions established in 1916
1916 establishments in New York City